John Haselock was an English politician who sat in the House of Commons from 1626 to 1629.

Haselock was one of the two Chamberlains of Worcester in 1621 and  Mayor of Worcester in 1623. In 1626, Haselock was elected Member of Parliament for Worcester. He was re-elected MP for Worcester in 1628 and sat until 1629 when King Charles decided to rule without parliament for eleven years. He was fined for not taking knighthood on 4 March 1631.

References

Year of birth missing
Year of death missing
Politicians from Worcestershire
Mayors of places in Worcestershire
English MPs 1626
English MPs 1628–1629